La Madrastra ("The Step-Mother") may refer to the following television series:

 La madrastra (1962 TV series), Mexican telenovela
 La madrastra (1981 TV series), Chilean telenovela
 La Madrastra (2005 TV series), Mexican telenovela
 La madrastra (2022 TV series), Mexican telenovela

See Also 
 Madrasta (disambiguation)